Johnny Sequoyah Friedenberg (born October 25, 2002) is an American actress, best known for her roles as Bo Adams on the NBC television series Believe and Audrey on the Dexter revival miniseries Dexter: New Blood.

Early life and career
Sequoyah was born in Los Angeles and spent her first eight years in her mother's home state of Idaho. She began acting at age eight in independent films. In 2013 and 2014, she appeared in Ass Backwards and I Believe in Unicorns. She starred in Among Ravens, directed by her father, Russell Friedenberg, and produced by her mother, Heather Rae.

In 2014, she appeared in the thriller film Wind Walkers, also directed by her father. Her most notable role was Bo Adams in the NBC television series Believe. In 2016 portrayed "Taylor Otto" in the pilot for the ABC series American Housewife, but was replaced by Meg Donnelly before the series was picked up by the network.

In August 2019, it was announced that Sequoyah had joined the cast of Love, Victor, the Hulu sequel series to the 2018 film Love, Simon, set to play the role of Mia. However, later that month, the role was recast with Rachel Naomi Hilson due to a decision to take the character in a new creative direction. In 2021, Sequoyah played Audrey on the Dexter revival miniseries Dexter: New Blood.

Filmography

Film

Television

References

External links

2002 births
Living people
People from Boise, Idaho
American child actresses
Actresses from Idaho
21st-century American women